The Heuchelberg is a hill ridge, about 15 kilometres long and up to , a few kilometres southwest of the city of Heilbronn in the eponymous county in the German state of Baden-Württemberg.

Location 
The Heuchelberg and the adjacent Stromberg region south of the River Zaber both give their names to the Stromberg-Heuchelberg Nature Park founded in 1980, the third nature park in Baden-Württemberg.

The Heuchelberg runs through the western part of the county of Heilbronn between Leingarten in the northeast and Zaberfeld in the southwest. It lies on the territories of the following towns and villages (clockwise from the northeast): Leingarten, Nordheim, Brackenheim, Güglingen, Pfaffenhofen and Zaberfeld (in the southwest) and Eppingen (only the municipality of Kleingartach), Schwaigern and finally  Leingarten again.

Hills 

The hills and high points of the Heuchelberg ridge include the following − sorted by height in metres above Normalnull (NN):
 unnamed highest point of the Heuchelberg rubbish tip (353 m), between Stetten and Haberschlacht 
 Heidelberg (335.9 m), between Neipperg and Nordhausen
 High point on the Wolfsgrube (335.7 m), between Stetten and Haberschlacht
 Eichbühl (335 m), between Neipperg and Stetten
 Ottilienberg (313.6 m), between Eppingen and Kleingartach; including a circular rampart
 Spitzenberg (276.4 m), in Zaberfeld; with transmission towers and former castle of Burghalde

References

External links 
 Karte des Heuchelbergs auf: 
 

Regions of Baden-Württemberg
Heilbronn (district)
Natural regions of the Neckar and Tauber Gäu Plateaus